The Cathedral of St. Peter and St. Paul is the cathedral of the Catholic Diocese of Saint Clement at Saratov, in Saratov Oblast, Russia.

Saratov was from the mid-nineteenth century, the seat of the Bishop of Tiraspol in Imperial Russia. It was not resident in Tiraspol, but had jurisdiction over southern Russia and Siberia. Then the city was populated by large minorities of Poles and Germans from the Volga, the latter being installed in the region since the second half of the eighteenth century. The first Catholic church was built in 1805 in a small town growing with settlers from throughout the Empire.

During Soviet times the church was persecuted. After its dissolution, the church was not allowed to be returned to the Catholic community that occupied the old site. A new church was therefore built and consecrated to the Apostles Peter and Paul in 2000 with the presence of the apostolic nuncio, which was elevated to cathedral status in 2002 with the erection of the diocese.

See also
Catholic Church in Russia

References

Roman Catholic cathedrals in Russia
Buildings and structures in Saratov
Roman Catholic churches completed in 2000
21st-century Roman Catholic church buildings
Churches in Saratov Oblast